Björn Phau was the defending champion, but decided not to participate this year.
Pablo Carreño-Busta won the tournament after defeating Roberto Bautista-Agut 3–6, 6–3, 7–5 in the final.

Seeds

Draw

Finals

Top half

Bottom half

References
 Main Draw
 Qualifying Draw

Alessandria Challenger - Singles
Alessandria Challenger